Sergei Alekseevich Kapustin (13 February 1953 in Ukhta, Russian SFSR, Soviet Union – 4 June 1995) was an ice hockey player who played in the Soviet Hockey League.  He played for HC CSKA Moscow, Krylya Sovetov Moscow, and HC Spartak Moscow.

Kapustin played thirteen seasons with the Soviet Union national team. He was part of the team that won seven Gold Medals at the Ice Hockey World Championships in 1974, 1975, 1978, 1979, 1981, 1982, 1983. Kapustin was voted to the first All Star team at the 1978 and 1981 tournaments. He played for the Soviet Union team in the 1974 Summit Series, the 1976 Canada Cup, the Gold Medal team at the 1976 Winter Olympics, the 1979 Challenge Cup, and the 1981 Canada Cup. He was voted the "best forward" award at the 1978 Izvestia Cup.

Kapustin was selected by the New York Rangers of the National Hockey League (NHL) in the 1982 NHL Entry Draft, as they believed it possible he might go to North America.

Sergei Kapustin was inducted into the Russian and Soviet Hockey Hall of Fame in 1975. He retired in December 1985 after that year's Izvestia Cup tournament. He died of a heart attack in 1995 at age 42.

References

External links

1953 births
1995 deaths
HC CSKA Moscow players
HC Spartak Moscow players
Honoured Masters of Sport of the USSR
Ice hockey players at the 1976 Winter Olympics
New York Rangers draft picks
Olympic gold medalists for the Soviet Union
Olympic ice hockey players of the Soviet Union
Olympic medalists in ice hockey
People from Ukhta
Soviet ice hockey left wingers
Medalists at the 1976 Winter Olympics
Recipients of the Order of Friendship of Peoples
Sportspeople from the Komi Republic